Maximiliano 'Timpa' Timpanaro (born 23 March 1988; Azul, Buenos Aires Province) is an Argentine footballer who currently plays as a striker for ASD Stintino in Itália.

References

1988 births
Living people
Sportspeople from Buenos Aires Province
Argentine footballers
Association football midfielders
Association football forwards
Club Atlético Vélez Sarsfield footballers
Chacarita Juniors footballers
Argentine expatriate footballers
Expatriate footballers in Albania
Argentine expatriate sportspeople in Albania
Kategoria Superiore players
FK Dinamo Tirana players
CF Gandía players